"It's Good to Be King" is a song by American rock singer-songwriter Tom Petty, released as the third single from his 1994 album Wildflowers. It peaked at No. 68 on the Billboard Hot 100, and No. 6 on the Billboard Mainstream Rock chart.

Review
On AllMusic, reviewer Matthew Greenwald wrote about the song "One if the most self-effacing and personal songs to reach the Top Ten charts in the 1990s, It's Good to Be King deals with the phenomenon of rock & roll stardom." He described the song's melody as "elegant and folk-rock-ish", and also buttressed by a Michael Kamen string arrangement that he described as "absolutely stunning".

References

1994 songs
Tom Petty songs
Songs written by Tom Petty